Sheikh Khalipha Usman Nando (1940/1941 – February 5, 2023) was the first Wa'lī of Bangsamoro, and one of the co-founders of the Moro Islamic Liberation Front.

Education
Nando attended the Madrasah Al-rasheedah in Pandag which was then part of the town of Buluan in what was the Empire Province of Cotabato. He would secure a diplomatic scholarship to study at the Al-Azhar University. Nando studied at the institution in Cairo, Egypt in the early 1960s.

Moro Islamic Liberation Front
Khalipha Usman Nando was one of the co-founders of the Moro Islamic Liberation Front (MILF) along with Salamat Hashim and Abu Hurayra; the former being Nando's schoolmate and associate at Al-Azhar. As part of the MILF, Nando served under various capacities including as chairman of the MILF Central Committee on Education, chairman of Majlis Al-Shura (Consultative Assembly) and as head of the MILF Sharia Supreme Court.

Wāli of Bangsamoro
Nando, was appointed the first Wāli of the newly constituted Bangsamoro autonomous region by the interim Bangsamoro Parliament on March 29, 2019, during the inaugural session of the first interim meeting. He would likewise open the inaugural session of the second interim parliament on September 15, 2022.

His last public appearance prior to his death was on January 25, 2023 for the 4th anniversary of the establishment of the Bangsamoro autonomous region and the turnover ceremony of facilities for orphans and a grand mosque in Matanog.

Death
Nando died in a hospital in Davao on February 5, 2023, at the age of 81. His body was buried at his residence in Pandag, Maguindanao del Sur.

Notes

References

1940s births
Year of birth missing
2023 deaths
Filipino Muslims
Filipino Islamists
Al-Azhar University alumni
People from Bangsamoro